The Stymie Stakes is an American race for Thoroughbred horses at Aqueduct Racetrack. Usually raced in late February or early March, it is open to horses age four and older. It is run on dirt over a distance of one mile and offers a purse of $150,000.

The race was named in honor of Stymie, the handicap champion of 1945.  A $1,500 claimer, he was inducted into the United States Racing Hall of Fame in 1975.  Making 131 career starts, Stymie won 35, placed in 33, and came in third 28 times.  At the time, his earnings of $918,485 set a record.  In the Blood-Horse magazine List of the Top 100 Racehorses of the 20th Century Stymie is listed as #41.

Originally a handicap race for horses age three and older, the Stymie was a Grade 3 event from 1973 through 2002 after which it became a Listed race. It was hosted by Belmont Park from inception in 1956 to 1961, and again between 1968 and 1975.

Historic notes
The great Kelso won the Stymie Handicap in 1962 then in 1965 won it again in what would be the final win of his brilliant career, capped off with his fifth American Horse of the Year title.

The 1972 edition of the Stymie Handicap was won by the Venezuelan longshot Canonero II who had won the 1971 Kentucky Derby and Preakness Stakes. In capturing the Stymie, Canonero II won by five lengths while equaling the North American record for a mile and an eighth.

Records
Speed  record:
 1:46.20 @ 1/1/8 miles: Canonero II (1972) & Key To The Kingdom (1974)
 2:00.40  @ 1/14 miles: Grace Born (1968)

Most wins:
 2 – Kelso (1962, 1965)
 2 – It's Academic (1989, 1990)
 2 – More to Tell (1995, 1996)
 2 – Ground Storm (2002, 2004)
 2 – Turco Bravo (2015, 2016)

Most wins by a jockey:
 4 – Jorge Velásquez (1971, 1975, 1985, 1990)

Most wins by a trainer:
 3 – Bruce Levine  (1994, 2000, 2005)
 3 – Gasper S. Moschera (1995, 1996, 1997)
 3 – Gary Contessa (2008, 2015, 2016)
 3 – Todd A. Pletcher (2006, 2010, 2019)

Most wins by an owner:
 3 – Winning Move Stable (Sigler family) (2008, 2015, 2016)

Winners

 Ŧ – Turco Bravo, Southern Hemisphere foal of October 13, 2009.

References

Open mile category horse races
Horse races in New York City
Ungraded stakes races in the United States
Aqueduct Racetrack
Recurring sporting events established in 1956
1956 establishments in New York City